Ziveh (also Romanized as Zīveh; also known as Zira) is a village in Piran Rural District of the Central District of Piranshahr County, West Azerbaijan province, Iran. At the 2006 National Census, its population was 1,281 in 238 households. The following census in 2011 counted 1,423 people in 287 households. The latest census in 2016 showed a population of 1,323 people in 327 households; it was the largest village in its rural district.

References 

Piranshahr County

Populated places in West Azerbaijan Province

Populated places in Piranshahr County